Jonas Coe Heartt (August 12, 1793 - April 30, 1874) was an American businessman and politician.

Early life
Heartt was born on August 12, 1793 in Troy, Rensselaer County, New York.  He was the son of Philip Heartt, and was the first child baptized by the first pastor of the Troy First Presbyterian church, and for this reason he was given the name of the pastor, Jonas Coe.

Career
In 1822, he was elected assistant alderman for the Second Ward. He was also supervisor of this ward for 1833, 1835 and 1836, and in 1838 he was elected Mayor of Troy by the City Council. He was re-elected each following year until 1843, and was the first mayor elected by popular vote, in 1840. During his mayoralty measures were adopted for building the Schenectady and Troy Railroad. It was through the united efforts of Mayor Heartt and Jonathan Edwards that Troy was made the terminus instead of a branch of the Hudson River Railroad. He was instrumental in having a direct line of steamboats from Troy to New York, and for twelve years was a director in the River Steamboat Association. He was a director of the Troy and Boston Railroad from the time of its construction until his death.

In 1852, he was a Whig member of the New York State Assembly and was elected Speaker.

Personal life
On August 30, 1814, he married Catherine Lamberson. Together, they were the parents of many children, including:

 Jane Lamberson Heartt (1825–1880), who married banker Edward Schell.

Heartt died on April 30, 1874 in New York City.

References

1793 births
1874 deaths
New York (state) Whigs
19th-century American politicians
Members of the New York State Assembly
Speakers of the New York State Assembly
19th-century American railroad executives